The Lycée Franco-Libanais de Tripoli, also known as Lycée Franco-Libanais Alphonse de Lamartine is a 15-year private school (kindergarten through 12th grade) in North Lebanon, founded in 1973 by the Mission laïque française, as an annex to the Grand Lycée Franco-Libanais in Beirut. It was initially situated in Tripoli, then moved to Ras Maska and is now in its new establishment in Kfar Kahel.

Education and curriculum
The primary language used in the school is French, but Arabic and English are also required. 
As a member of the Mission laïque française (the French secular mission), the primary missions of the Lycée Franco-Libanais Tripoli are to spread secular values and the French language.
The school is considered prestigious because it offers a double curriculum and invests in language instruction. Students are required to cover fully both the French curriculum and the Lebanese curriculum, with no "single curriculum" option except for children of expatriate French citizens who join late. For all students, but especially for Lebanese citizens, admission to the school is competitive based on examination, and priority is often given to children of alumni and siblings of current students. 
Traditionally, more attention is given to the French curriculum in the final years of highschool (in preparation for the French baccalauréat, and more attention is given to the Lebanese curriculum in the final year of middle school (9th grade) in preparation for the Lebanese Brevet.

External links
Mission laïque française
Lycée Franco-Libanais de Tripoli - Alphonse de Lamartine
Lycée Franco-Libanais de Tripoli de la  Mission laïque française au Liban
Amical des anciens Lycéens

French international schools in Lebanon
Tripoli, Lebanon
Educational institutions established in 1973
1973 establishments in Lebanon